Bazar Ahmed Khan is a town and union council of Bannu District in Khyber Pakhtunkhwa province of Pakistan. It is located at 32°59'6N 70°38'32E and has an altitude of 344 metres (1131 feet).

References

Union councils of Bannu District
Populated places in Bannu District